Ma Tau Chung Camp was an internment camp in Ma Tau Chung, Hong Kong during the Japanese Occupation of Hong Kong during World War II.

The camp was built around 1941, originally as a refugee camp, as North Point Camp and Argyle Street Camp. It was located on parts of today's Ma Tau Chung Road and Ma Tau Wai Estate.

The camp was closed in 1944 when the remaining Indian POWs moved back to Argyle Street Camp. It was later re-opened as the Ma Tau Wai Camp, holding third country national civilians.

See also
 List of Japanese-run internment camps during World War II

References

Japanese occupation of Hong Kong
Ma Tau Chung
Japanese prisoner of war and internment camps